An assembly hall is a hall to hold public meetings or meetings of an organization such as a school, church, or deliberative assembly. An example of the last case is the Assembly Hall (Washington, Mississippi) where the general assembly of the state of Mississippi was held. Some Christian denominations call their meeting places or places of worship assembly halls. Elders and ministers of Presbyterian churches gather in assembly halls for their general assemblies, such as in the General Assembly Hall of the Church of Scotland.

College and university campuses

On the campuses of colleges and universities in the United States, assembly halls are sometimes found in multipurpose athletic buildings, where they share other uses, including as basketball courts. Examples are Assembly Hall (Bloomington) and (formerly) Assembly Hall (Champaign).

See also
Conference hall
Meeting house
Assembly rooms
 Wedding reception
 Church hall
 Village hall

References

Meetings
Rooms